Kentucky Vintage is a bourbon produced in Bardstown, Kentucky by Kentucky Bourbon Distillers (KBD), also known as the Willett distillery. The brand is one of several small batch bourbon offerings by KBD – the others include Noah's Mill, Rowan's Creek and Pure Kentucky XO.

The bourbon has a relatively long aging period (substantially more than a decade – "long beyond that of any ordinary bourbon", according to the label) and is hand-bottled at 45.0% alc./vol. (90 U.S. proof).

See also
 Kentucky Bourbon Distillers (the company that produces Kentucky Vintage bourbon)

References

Bourbon whiskey
Bardstown, Kentucky
Alcoholic drink brands
American brands